Kali Malone is an American composer and organist based in Stockholm. Her works implement unique tuning systems in minimalist form for analog and digital synthesis often combined with acoustic instrumentation.

Early life
Malone was raised in Denver, Colorado. She moved to Western Massachusetts to study music, but relocated to Stockholm in 2012 after befriending the Swedish avant-garde composer Ellen Arkbro. She studied electroacoustic composition at the Royal College of Music, Stockholm.

Career
In 2016 she co-founded the record label and concert series XKatedral, together with Maria W Horn, in Stockholm.

In 2019, she released The Sacrificial Code, featuring nearly two hours of pipe organ compositions, through iDEAL Recordings. The album made the year-end lists of Pitchfork, The Wire, and 2019 Album of the Year from Boomkat.

In 2022, she released Living Torch, a 33-minute piece presented in two movements. It was commissioned by the French electroacoustic music studio Groupe de Recherches Musicales (GRM) for its loudspeaker orchestra, the Acousmonium. The album features a departure of the pipe organ that typified Malone's music. It features a mélange of acoustic and electronic instruments including the trombone and bass clarinet to the more experimental boîte à bourdon. It was composed by Malone in 11-odd limit just intonation. The trombone and bass clarinet were recorded in meticulous individual parts to match each computer-generated sound wave. It was stitched together by Malone with heavily textured drones as well as the boîte à bourdon and sounds generated from the ARP 2500 modular synthesizer unit owned by Éliane Radigue. Malone composed and produced the album at the GRM in Paris between 2020 and 2021. It is the first collaboration between the GRM and its new label-partner Shelter Press, continuing the Portraits GRM record series which Peter Rehberg of Editions MEGO set the foundation for in 2012. The album was premiered at the GRM in October 2021, three months after Rehberg's death. The album was released by Portraits GRM on July 7, 2022.

In 2023, she released Does Spring Hide Its Joy, a collaboration with Sunn O))) member Stephen O'Malley and British cellist Lucy Railton. It was composed and recorded between March and May 2020 in the empty concert halls of Berlin Funkhaus and MONOM during the COVID-19 pandemic lockdown. Malone plays tuned sine wave oscillators on the album while O'Malley appears on electric guitar and Lucy Railton on cello. The album consists of an hour-long composition presented in three versions—each a minor variation on the titular piece. It was released through O'Malley's Ideologic Organ label on January 20, 2023.

Discography

Studio albums

Compilation albums

EPs

Other

With Morbida

With Taxi Taxi

With Hästköttskandalen

With Swap Babies

With Sorrowing Christ

With Golden Offence Orchestra

References

External links
 
 

Living people
Year of birth missing (living people)
21st-century American composers
21st-century classical composers
American classical composers
American composers
American expatriates in Sweden
American organists
American women classical composers
American women in electronic music
Composers for pipe organ
Electroacoustic music composers
Minimalist composers
Musicians from Denver
Musicians from Stockholm
Royal College of Music, Stockholm alumni
Women organists